The Museu da Tabanca is a museum in the town Chã de Tanque in the western part of the island of Santiago in Cape Verde. It is dedicated to local culture, including tabanka music. The museum was first opened in 2000 in Assomada, the seat of the municipality of Santa Catarina, but in December 2008 it was moved to its current location in Chã de Tanque, also part of Santa Catarina. After two years of renovation, it was reopened in November 2017.

See also
List of museums in Cape Verde
List of buildings and structures in Santiago, Cape Verde

References

External links

Museu da Tabanka 
 https://web.archive.org/web/20070323110100/http://biztravels.net/biztravels/museums.php?id=127&lg=pt 
Profile of Museum at Saatchi (portuguese)

Tabanka
Santa Catarina, Cape Verde
Tabanka
Music museums
2000 establishments in Cape Verde